
The wey or weight (Old English: , waege,  "weight") was an English unit of weight and dry volume by at least 900 AD, when it begins to be mentioned in surviving legal codes.

Weight
A statute of Edgar the Peaceful set a price floor on wool by threatening both the seller and purchaser who agreed to trade a wool wey for less than 120 pence (i.e., ½ pound of sterling silver per wey), but the wey itself varied over time and by location. The wey was standardized as 14 stone of 12½ merchants' pounds each (175 lbs. or around 76.5 kg) by the time of the Assize of Weights and Measures . This wey was applied to lead, soap, and cheese as well as wool. 2 wey made a sack, 12 a load, and 24 a last.

The wool wey was later figured as 2 hundredweight of 8 stone of 14 avoirdupois pounds each (224 lbs. or about 101.7 kg).

The Suffolk wey was 356 avoirdupois pounds (around 161.5 kg). It was used as a measure for butter and cheese.

Volume

See also
 English units
 Stone, sack, last, & load
 Whey (unit)

References

Units of mass
Units of volume
Obsolete units of measurement